Dorset is an unincorporated community in Henrietta Township, Hubbard County, Minnesota, United States.

Hubbard County State-Aid Highways 7 and 18; and State Highway 226 are three of the main routes in the community. State Highway 34 is nearby. Dorset is located along the Heartland State Trail.

History
A post office called Dorset was established in 1898, and remained in operation until it was discontinued in 1964. The community was named by railroad officials.

On the morning of September 4, 2014, a fire caused by a severe lightning storm destroyed two popular establishments, the Dorset House and Compañeros Mexican Restaurant. Both restaurants were rebuilt and reopened in May 2016.

Mayor of Dorset
The position of mayor of Dorset is a symbolic one, the town being run by a group of five local business owners. The town holds a yearly election at the "Taste of Dorset" festival, residents paying $1 to add a name of their choice to a hat, with a random slip being drawn to select a mayor.

In August 2012, then three-year-old Robert "Bobby" Tufts became mayor for a one-year term, when his name was drawn. On August 4, 2013, Tufts was elected for a second term. Tufts lost a re-election campaign in 2014 to 16-year-old Eric Mueller. Tufts's three-year-old brother, James, was also elected in August 2015. 4-year-old Gwendolyn Davis of Utah won the mayorship in 2016.

The mayor of Dorset for 2021-22 is Jade Kruger of Moorhead.

References

External links
 Dorset, Minnesota – Official Website

Unincorporated communities in Hubbard County, Minnesota
Unincorporated communities in Minnesota